Gustavo David Noguera Domínguez (born 7 November 1987 in Santa Elena, Paraguay) is a Paraguayan footballer who plays as a right-back. He previously had a lengthy career in Paragayan football and also briefly played for Argentine club Quilmes.

References

External links
 
 
 

1987 births
Living people
Paraguayan footballers
Association football fullbacks
Argentine Primera División players
12 de Octubre Football Club players
Club Atlético 3 de Febrero players
Cerro Porteño (Presidente Franco) footballers
Club Sol de América footballers
Sportivo Luqueño players
Club Libertad footballers
Club Nacional footballers
Club Olimpia footballers
Club Tacuary footballers
2 de Mayo footballers
Quilmes Atlético Club footballers
Deportivo Capiatá players
General Díaz footballers
Club Rubio Ñu footballers
Paraguayan expatriate footballers
Paraguayan expatriate sportspeople in Argentina
Expatriate footballers in Argentina